Pedro Enrique González Pierella (born 24 December 1970 in Buenos Aires, Argentina) is a retired Argentinian professional footballer.

Pedro González began his professional career with UE Lleida (Spanish Segunda División), and then he played for several clubs during his career, in Mexico, Chile, Argentina, Spain, and Uruguay.

References
 Profile at BDFA
 
 Don Balon Chile 1995-1996, (Biblioteca Nacional Santiago)

1970 births
Living people
Argentine footballers
UE Lleida players
Atlético Morelia players
Provincial Osorno footballers
Boca Juniors footballers
Deportivo Español footballers
C.D. Huachipato footballers
Deportes Concepción (Chile) footballers
CD Badajoz players
Club Nacional de Football players
Unión Española footballers
Club Deportivo Palestino footballers
Liga MX players
Argentine expatriate sportspeople in Chile
Argentine expatriate sportspeople in Mexico
Argentine expatriate sportspeople in Spain
Argentine expatriate footballers
Expatriate footballers in Spain
Expatriate footballers in Chile
Expatriate footballers in Mexico
Association football wingers
Footballers from Buenos Aires